Alexander Roux (1813–1886) was a French-trained ébéniste, or cabinetmaker, who emigrated to the United States in the 1830s. He opened a shop in New York City in 1837. The business grew quickly: by the 1850s he employed 120 craftsmen in his shop and introduced then-new industrial technologies, such as steam-powered saws.

Roux specialized in the ornate Rococo Revival style, but practiced many others. His work is highly sought by collectors, with larger and more complex pieces fetching large sums. One of his sideboards was featured in a 2000 exhibit at New York's Metropolitan Museum of Art.

External links
Roux sideboard at the Metropolitan Museum of Art 
Roux sideboard at Yale University Art Gallery

References

French furniture designers
American furniture designers
American cabinetmakers
American woodworkers
Artists from New York City
French emigrants to the United States
1813 births
1886 deaths